Jai Maharashtra Dhaba Bhatinda, also known by the abbreviated form JMDB, is a Marathi film released on 14 February 2013 directed by Avadhoot Gupte. It is a love story. starring new faces Abhijeet Khandkekar, Tushar Kamble and Prarthana Behere. It is produced by Ekvira Productions, A Square Entertainment, Black Gold Films.

Plot 
A young Maharashrtiyan man from Kolhapur migrates to Punjab and launches a Maharashtrian dhaba. Then he falls in love with a Punjabi girl.
There is also curiosity about a song with fusion of Marathi Powada and Punjabi Bhangda.

Cast 
Abhijeet Khandkekar as Sayaji Nimbalkar (Saya)
Prarthana Behere as Jaspinder Kaur (Jas)
Vikram Gokhale as Prataprao Nimbalkar
Puneet Issar as Jas' father
 Monika Dabade as Gurpreet
Priyadarshan Jadhav
Janhavi Prabhu-Arora as cameo role
Avadhoot Gupte
Kanwalpreet Singh

Music 
The music director was Nilesh Moharir, and the music was composed by Nilesh Moharir and lyrics were written by Guru Thakur. Before the film was released, there was a special launch for the music, sung by veteran singer Suresh Wadkar, and distributed on audio cassettes. The event was attended by Moharir, Thakur, singers Swapnil Bandodkar, Vaishali Samant and Janhavi Prabhu-Arora, producer Atul Kamble, co-producer Rahul Kamble, and lead actors Abhijit Khandkekar and Prarthana Behere.  The music received good reviews.

Track listing

Critical reception
A Reviewer of Loksatta wrote "Abhijit Khandkekar and Prarthana Behere both look cool. Prayer has worked very well. She has shown many shades like hatred, impulse, anger, love, impudence very well". A Reviewer of  The Times of India wrote "Vikram Gokhale, Shubhangi Latkar, Priyadarshan Jadhav justify their characters. Nilesh Mohrir’s music suits the script. Though the title generates curiosity, the story deflates it!!".

References

External links 
 

2010s Marathi-language films